A floral zone is an area with similar distributions of plant species, usually a horizontal belt determined by elevation. In a historic report on plant distribution in the United States, The Death Valley Expedition: A Biological Survey of Parts of California, Nevada, Arizona, and Utah, naturalist Clinton Hart Merriam describes “Most of the desert shrubs are social plants and are distributed in well-marked belts or zones, the vertical limits of which are fixed by the temperature during the period of growth and reproduction.”

See also
 Altitudinal zonation
 Life zone

References

Botany